is a Japanese kickboxer, currently competing in the super featherweight division of K-1, where he is the Super Featherweight champion. He took the family name of his first trainer Karateka Nicholas Pettas. Pettas is the 2022 K-1 Super Featherweight World Grand Prix winner, the former Krush Super Featherweight champion and a one-time K-1 super featherweight title challenger.

He was ranked as a top ten bantamweight by Combat Press between September 2020 and July 2022, peaking at #2. Combat Press ranked him the #4 Flyweight in May and June 2019, and #3 Flyweight between July 2019 and August 2020.

Kickboxing career

Early career

Career beginnings
Pettas made his professional debut against Shota, during Krush-EX 2012 vol.3 on June 17, 2012. He won the fight by a first-round knockout. Pettas was booked to fight Yoshikazu Isobe at Krush-EX 2012 vol.5 on October 21, 2012. He fight which he won by technical knockout, 22 second into the second round.

Pettas suffered his first professional loss on January 14, 2013, at Krush Grand Prix 2013, when he dropped a unanimous decision to Katsuya Goto.

Pettas rebounded from this loss by winning his next three fights. Pettas first knocked out Hitoshi Aketo in the second round at Krush-IGNITION 2013 vol.3 on April 21, 2013,. He followed this up with unanimous decision win against Junpei Aotsu at Krush.30 on August 11, 2013. Pettas extended his winning streak to three consecutive fights at Krush.36 on April 1, 2014, as he beat Takeshi Watanabe by unanimous decision.

Leona's three fight winning streak was snapped by Kotaro Shimano at Krush.39 on March 8, 2014, who stopped Pettas by technical knockout in the first round.

Pettas won four of his next six fights. He won decisions against Tomohiro Kitai at Krush.41 on May 11, 2014, Keisuke Nakamura at Krush.54 on May 4, 2015, and Masahiro Yamamoto at Krush.56 on August 14, 2016, and stopped Toshi with a head kick at Krush.46 on October 5, 2014. During this run, Pettas drew against Fumiya Osawa at Krush.44 on August 9, 2014, and lost a unanimous decision against Haruaki Otsuki at Krush.50 on January 4, 2015.

Hero Legends tournament
Pettas made his K-1 debut at K-1 World GP 2015 The Championship against Taiga Kawabe on November 21, 2015. He won the fight by majority decision. Pettas then faced Toshi at K-1 World GP 2016 -60kg Japan Tournament on April 24, 2016. He lost the rematch by unanimous decision.

Leona Pettas participated in the 2016 Hero Legends 60 kg tournament. He defeated Zhou Biao by decision in the first round, Xie Yuhang by TKO in the quarterfinals, Feng Tianhao by KO in the semifinals, and won the tournament with a decision win over Li Qiyu.

Rise up the ranks

Krush Super Featherweight tournament
Pettas returned to Krush in order to face Yuta Takahashi. Their fight was scheduled for the undercard of Krush.71, which took place on December 12, 2016. He won the fight by unanimous decision, with two scorecards of 30–26 and once scorecard of 30–27. After notching his first win under the Krush banner in two years, Pettas took part in the 2017 Krush Super Featherweight tournament. He faced Hayato, in the tournament quarterfinals, at Krush.73 on February 18, 2017. He won the fight by unanimous decision.

Pettas faced Taio Asahisa in the tournament semifinals at Krush.75 on April 2, 2017. He won the fight by a unanimous decision (30–27, 29–27, 29–27). Pettas handed Asahisa the first knockdown of his professional career, in the first round of the fight. Pettas faced Riku Anpo in the final bout of the tournament at Krush.76 on May 28, 2017. He lost the fight by unanimous decision. Two of the judges scored the fight 30–28 for Anpo, while the third judge scored the fight 30–29 in his favor.

Second title run
Pettas faced Yoshiki Harada at Krush.83 on December 9, 2017. He won the fight by a second-round knockout, stopping Harada with a flurry of punches at the 1:03 minute mark.

Petas faced Yuma Saikyo at Krush 87 on April 22, 2018, in his first fight of the year. He won the fight by unanimous decision, with scores of 29–28, 30–29 and 29–28. Leona then faced Zhao Chongyang during Krush 90 on July 22, 2018. He beat Chongyang by a second round knockout.

Pettas faced Taio Asahisa at Krush.98 on February 16, 2019. The fight was a rematch of their April 2, 2017, which Pettas won the fight by unanimous decision. He won the rematch the same manner, by unanimous decision.

Pettas faced the former RISE Super Featherweight champion Kosuke Komiyama at K-1 World GP 2019: Super Bantamweight World Tournament on June 30, 2019. Extending his winning streak to five, Pettas knocked Komiyama out with a left jab in the second round.

Krush super featherweight champion

Title reign
Pettas was rewarded for his five-fight winning streak with the chance to challenge the reigning Krush Super Featherweight champion Yuma Saikyo, in what was Saikyo's first title defense. The bout was scheduled as the main event of Krush.105, which took place on September 16, 2019. Pettas won the fight by a narrow majority decision, with scores of 29–28, 30–28 and 29–29.

Pettas made his first Krush title defense against Naoki Yamamoto at Krush 109 on December 15, 2019. He won the fight by a second-round technical knockout. During his post-fight speech, Pettas called for a fight with the K-1 super featherweight champion Takeru Segawa, stating: "There are no Japanese fighters anymore [who could challenge him]".

Petas faced the former K-1 Featherweight and RISE Bantamweight champion Yuta Murakoshi at K-1: K’Festa 3 on March 22, 2020. He won the fight by a third-round technical knockout. Pettas knocked Murakoshi down with a right hook in the first round and, while a second hook in the third round was enough to finish the fight. He once again called for a fight with Takeru during his post-fight interview.

Pettas made his second Krush title defense against Takeru's teammate Tatsuya Oiwa at Krush 115 on June 28, 2020. He won the fight by unanimous decision, with scores of 30–29, 30–29 and 30–28.

Pettas vs. Takeru
Pettas was finally booked to face the K-1 super featherweight champion Takeru Segawa at K-1 World GP 2020 in Fukuoka on November 3, 2020. Due to his stature, particular skilleset and good run of form, Pettas was considered as one of the toughest challenges in Takeru's career up to that point. At the time of the fight's scheduling, Takeru was ranked as the best fighter under 60 kg. On October 9, 2020, it was revealed that Takeru had withdrawn from the bout after he had suffered a fracture in his left hand during training, and which would require surgery. The fight was re-scheduled for K-1: K’Festa 4 on January 24, 2021, but was once again postponed on January 7 as the Japanese government declared a state of emergency due to the COVID-19 pandemic. The fight was once again rescheduled for K'Festa 4 Day 2, which took place on March 28, 2021.

Despite a good start to the fight which saw him successfully utilize his height and reach to outfight, Pettas was knocked down with a left hook in the dying seconds of the opening round. He failed to recover sufficiently during the one-minute break in between the rounds, and was knocked out with a flurry of punches at the 1:10 minute mark of the second round.

K-1 super featherweight champion

Pre-championship catchweight bouts
Pettas vacated Krush super featherweight title on September 3, 2021, with the intention of moving up to lightweight (62.5 kg).
He faced Maki Chatchai, in a 61.5 kg catchweight bout, at K-1 World GP 2021 in Osaka on December 4, 2021. Pettas won the fight by unanimous decision, with all three judges scoring the fight 30–26 in his favor. He scored the sole knockdown of the fight in the first round, dropping Maki with a right straight.

Pettas next faced Kan Nakamura at The Match 2022 on June 19, 2022. He was surprised with the booking, stating: "Personally I thought I might fight Shiratori...When they gave me Nakamura, I watched his fights and he looked good, but his opponents were weak". Despite coming in as the favorite, he lost the fight by an upset majority decision. Two of the judges scored the bout 30–29 for Nakamura, while the third judge scored it as an even 30–30 draw.

K-1 Super Featherweight World Grand Prix
Pettas participated in the 2022 K-1 Super Featherweight World Grand Prix, held to crown a new divisional kingpin after the previous champion Takeru Segawa vacated the belt. Pettas faced Ayoub Segiri in the tournament quarterfinals at K-1 World GP 2022 Yokohamatsuri on September 11, 2022. He had a poor start to the fight, as he was knocked down with a left hook near the end of the opening round. Pettas was able to rebound in the following round however, and knocked Segiri out with his own left hook at the 1:01 minute mark. Pettas faced Tatsuya Oiwa in the penultimate bout of the one-day tournament, an opponent he had previously faced and beaten in his second Krush Super Featherweight title defense on June 28, 2020. He was equally successful in their second meeting and won the fight by a third round knockout. Petttas faced the Wu Lin Feng -60 kg champion Hirotaka Asahisa in the tournament final. He won the fight by unanimous decision, with all three judges scoring the bout 30–29 in his favor. Winning the vacant title earned Pettas the eFight "Fighter of the Month" award for the month of September as well.

Titles and accomplishments

Professional
Krush
 2019 Krush Super Featherweight Championship
Two successful title defenses
Hero Legends
 2016 Hero Legends -60 kg Asia Tournament Champion
K-1
2022 K-1 Super Featherweight World Grand Prix Winner
2022 K-1 Super Featherweight Championship

Amateur
Shin Karate
2009 108th Shin Karate Exchange Tournament K-3 Lightweight Runner-up
2011 Tokyo Region Shin Karate K-2 Tournament Lightweight Champion
2011 All Japan Shin Karate K-2 Grand Prix Lightweight Runner-up
J-NETWORK
2011 J-NETWORK All Japan A-League Featherweight Champion

Awards
K-1
 2021 K-1 Awards Fight of the Year (vs. Takeru)
eFight.jp
Fighter of the Month (July 2020, September 2022)

Kickboxing record

|-  style="text-align:center; background:#cfc;"
| 2022-09-11 || Win || align=left| Hirotaka Asahisa  ||  K-1 World GP 2022 Yokohamatsuri, Tournament Final|| Yokohama, Japan || Decision (Unanimous) || 3 || 3:00 
|-
! style=background:white colspan=9 |

|-  style="text-align:center; background:#cfc;"
| 2022-09-11 || Win || align=left| Tatsuya Oiwa  ||  K-1 World GP 2022 Yokohamatsuri, Tournament Semifinals|| Yokohama, Japan || KO (Flying knee) ||3 ||0:12

|-  style="text-align:center; background:#cfc;"
| 2022-09-11 || Win|| align=left| Ayoub Segiri ||  K-1 World GP 2022 Yokohamatsuri, Tournament Quarterfinals  || Yokohama, Japan || KO (Punch) || 2 || 1:01
|-
|-  style="text-align:center; background:#fbb;"
| 2022-06-19 || Loss ||align=left| Kan Nakamura || THE MATCH 2022 || Tokyo, Japan || Decision (Majority) || 3 || 3:00
|-  style="text-align:center; background:#cfc"
| 2021-12-04 || Win || align=left| Chatchai Maki|| K-1 World GP 2021 in Osaka || Osaka, Japan || Decision (Unanimous) || 3 ||3:00

|-  style="text-align:center; background:#fbb;"
| 2021-03-28|| Loss ||align=left| Takeru || K-1 World GP 2021: K’Festa 4 Day.2 || Tokyo, Japan || KO (Punches) || 2 || 1:10 
|-
! style=background:white colspan=9 |
|-  style="text-align:center; background:#cfc;"
| 2020-06-28|| Win ||align=left| Tatsuya Oiwa || Krush 115 || Tokyo, Japan || Decision (Unanimous)|| 3 ||  3:00
|-
! style=background:white colspan=9 |
|-  style="text-align:center; background:#cfc;"
| 2020-03-22|| Win ||align=left| Yuta Murakoshi || K-1: K’Festa 3 || Saitama, Japan || TKO (Punches)|| 3|| 2:33
|-  style="text-align:center; background:#CCFFCC;"
| 2019-12-15|| Win ||align=left| Naoki Yamamoto || Krush.109 || Tokyo, Japan || TKO (Punches) || 2|| 2:08
|-
! style=background:white colspan=9 |
|-  style="text-align:center; background:#CCFFCC;"
| 2019-09-16|| Win ||align=left| Yuma Saikyo || Krush.105 || Tokyo, Japan || Decision (Majority) || 3 || 3:00
|-
! style=background:white colspan=9 |
|-  style="text-align:center; background:#CCFFCC;"
| 2019-06-30|| Win ||align=left| Kosuke Komiyama || K-1 World GP 2019: Super Bantamweight World Tournament || Saitama, Japan || KO (Left Jab) || 2 || 2:14
|-  style="text-align:center; background:#CCFFCC;"
| 2019-02-16|| Win ||align=left| Taio Asahisa || Krush.98 || Tokyo, Japan || Decision (Unanimous)|| 3 || 3:00
|-  style="text-align:center; background:#CCFFCC;"
| 2018-07-22|| Win ||align=left| Zhao Chongyang || Krush.90 || Tokyo, Japan || KO (Punches) || 2 || 2:49
|-  style="text-align:center; background:#CCFFCC;"
| 2018-04-22|| Win ||align=left| Yuma Saikyo || Krush.87 || Tokyo, Japan || Decision (Unanimous)|| 3 || 3:00
|-  style="text-align:center; background:#CCFFCC;"
| 2017-12-09|| Win ||align=left| Yoshiki Harada || Krush.83 || Tokyo, Japan || KO (Punches)|| 2 || 1:03
|-  style="text-align:center; background:#FFBBBB;"
| 2017-05-28|| Loss ||align=left| Riku Anpo || Krush.76, Tournament Final || Tokyo, Japan || Decision (Unanimous)|| 3 || 3:00
|-
! style=background:white colspan=9 |
|-  style="text-align:center; background:#CCFFCC;"
| 2017-04-02|| Win ||align=left| Taio Asahisa || Krush.75, Tournament Semifinal || Tokyo, Japan || Decision (Unanimous)|| 3 || 3:00
|-  style="text-align:center; background:#CCFFCC;"
| 2017-02-18|| Win ||align=left| Hayato || Krush.73, Tournament Quarterfinal || Tokyo, Japan || Decision (Unanimous)|| 3 || 3:00
|-  style="text-align:center; background:#CCFFCC;"
| 2016-12-18|| Win ||align=left| Yuta Takahashi || Krush.71 || Tokyo, Japan || Decision (Unanimous)|| 3 || 3:00
|-  style="text-align:center; background:#CCFFCC;"
| 2016-10-02|| Win ||align=left| Li Qiyu || Hero Legends -60 kg Asia Tournament, Final || China || Decision || 3 || 3:00 
|-
! style=background:white colspan=9 |
|-  style="text-align:center; background:#CCFFCC;"
| 2016-10-02|| Win ||align=left| Feng Tianhao || Hero Legends -60 kg Asia Tournament, Semi Finals || China || KO (Body shot) || 3 ||
|-  style="text-align:center; background:#CCFFCC;"
| 2016-08-20|| Win ||align=left| Xie Yuhang || Hero Legends -60 kg Asia Tournament, Quarter Finals|| China || TKO (Knee) || 1 || 0:26
|-  style="text-align:center; background:#CCFFCC;"
| 2016-08-20|| Win ||align=left| Zhou Biao || Hero Legends -60 kg Asia Tournament, First Round  || China || Decision || 3 || 3:00
|-  style="text-align:center; background:#FFBBBB;"
| 2016-04-24 || Loss || align=left| Toshi || K-1 World GP 2016 -60kg Japan Tournament || Tokyo, Japan || Decision (Unanimous) || 3 || 3:00
|-  style="text-align:center; background:#CCFFCC;"
| 2015-11-21|| Win ||align=left| Taiga || K-1 World GP 2015 The Championship || Japan || Decision (Majority)|| 3 || 3:00
|-  style="text-align:center; background:#CCFFCC;"
| 2015-08-14|| Win ||align=left| Masahiro Yamamoto || Krush.56 || Japan || Decision (Unanimous)|| 3 || 3:00
|-  style="text-align:center; background:#CCFFCC;"
| 2015-05-04|| Win ||align=left| Keisuke Nakamura || Krush.54 || Japan || Decision (Unanimous)|| 3 || 3:00
|-  style="text-align:center; background:#FFBBBB;"
| 2015-01-04|| Loss ||align=left| Haruaki Otsuki || Krush.50 || Japan || Decision (Unanimous)|| 3 || 3:00
|-  style="text-align:center; background:#CCFFCC;"
| 2014-10-05 || Win || align=left| Toshi || Krush.46 || Tokyo, Japan || KO (Right High Kick)|| 1 || 2:21
|-  style="text-align:center; background:#c5d2ea;"
| 2014-08-09 || Draw || align=left| Fumiya Osawa || Krush.44 || Tokyo, Japan || Decision || 3 || 3:00
|-  style="text-align:center; background:#CCFFCC;"
| 2014-05-11 || Win || align=left| Tomohiro Kitai || Krush.41 || Tokyo, Japan || Decision (Unanimous)|| 3 || 3:00
|-  style="text-align:center; background:#FFBBBB;"
| 2014-03-08 || Loss || align=left| Kotaro Shimano || Krush.39 || Tokyo, Japan || TKO (Doctor Stoppage) || 1 || 1:03
|-  style="text-align:center; background:#CCFFCC;"
| 2014-01-04 || Win || align=left| Takeshi Watanabe || Krush.36 || Tokyo, Japan || Decision (Unanimous) || 3 || 3:00
|-  style="text-align:center; background:#CCFFCC;"
| 2013-08-11 || Win || align=left| Junpei Aotsu || Krush.30 || Tokyo, Japan || Decision (Unanimous) || 3 || 3:00
|-  style="text-align:center; background:#CCFFCC;"
| 2013-04-21 || Win || align=left| Hitoshi Aketo || Krush-IGNITION 2013 vol.3 || Tokyo, Japan || KO (Punches) || 2 || 0:44
|-  style="text-align:center; background:#FFBBBB;"
| 2013-01-14 || Loss || align=left| Katsuya Goto || Krush Grand Prix 2013 || Tokyo, Japan || Decision (Unanimous)|| 3 || 3:00
|-  style="text-align:center; background:#CCFFCC;"
| 2012-10-21 || Win || align=left| Yoshikazu Isobe || Krush-EX 2012 vol.5 || Tokyo, Japan || TKO || 2 || 0:22
|-  style="text-align:center; background:#CCFFCC;"
| 2012-08-12 || Win || align=left| Ryutaro Takahashi || Krush 21 || Tokyo, Japan || KO (Right Cross)|| 1 || 1:41
|-  style="text-align:center; background:#CCFFCC;"
| 2012-06-17 || Win || align=left| Shota || Krush-EX 2012 vol.3 || Tokyo, Japan || KO || 1 || 2:03
|-
| colspan=9 | Legend:    

|-  style="background:#cfc;"
| 2012-04-01|| Win ||align=left| Yukinori Ogasawara || Rebels Amateur Tournament - 4th Blow Cup || Tokyo, Japan || Decision (Unanimous) || 2|| 2:00
|-
|-  style="background:#cfc;"
| 2011-09-11|| Win ||align=left| Shuichi Fujihara  || J-NETWORK Amateur All Japan A-League, Final || Japan || Decision (Unanimous)|| || 
|-
! style=background:white colspan=9 |
|-  style="background:#cfc;"
| 2011-09-11|| Win ||align=left| Hiroshi Nakazawa  || J-NETWORK Amateur All Japan A-League, Semi Final || Japan || Decision (Unanimous)|| ||
|-  style="background:#cfc;"
| 2011-09-11|| Win ||align=left| Masaki Takemura  || J-NETWORK Amateur All Japan A-League, Quarter Final || Japan || Decision (Unanimous)|| ||
|-  style="background:#fbb;"
|-  style="background:#cfc;"
| 2009-08-15|| Win ||align=left| Toshimichi Omata || Utsunomiya Shukenden vol.3 ～Challenge of UTSUNOMIYA's fighter～ || Utsunomiya, Japan || KO || 1|| 1:03
|-  style="background:#fbb;"
| 2009-06-28|| Loss||align=left| Tsukasa Fuji || K-1 Koshien 2009 Kanto Region Selection A-Block Tournament, Quarter Final || Kisarazu, Japan || Decision (Unanimous)|| 1|| 2:00
|-  style="background:#cfc;"
| 2009-06-28|| Win ||align=left|  || K-1 Koshien 2009 Kanto Region Selection A-Block Tournament, First Round || Kisarazu, Japan || KO || 1|| 2:00
|-  style="background:#cfc;"
| 2009-04-26|| Win||align=left| Koji Sato || Challenge Spirit - Destiny || Tokyo, Japan || KO || || 
|-
| colspan=9 | Legend:

See also
List of male kickboxers
List of Krush champions

References

Living people
1992 births
Japanese male kickboxers
Flyweight kickboxers
People from Iruma, Saitama
Sportspeople from Saitama Prefecture